Dry Valley is a short novel by a Nobel Prize-winning Russian author Ivan Bunin, first published in the April 1912 issue of the Saint Petersburg Vestnik Evropy magazine. Having come out soon after The Village (1910), it is usually linked to the latter as the author's second major book concerning the bleak state of Russia as a whole and its rural community in particular. It is also regarded as the last in Bunin's early 1900s cycle of "gentry elegies". The novel was filmed in 2011, directed by Aleksandra Strelyanaya.

History 
Bunin started working upon the book in summer 1911, when at the Vasilyevsky estate in Oryol Governorate. In September of that year he wrote to the Moskovskaya Vest correspondent: "I've just finished the first part of a large novelet called Dry Valley". The work was finished in December 1911 on Capri where Bunin stayed at Maxim Gorky's home. On February 21 he read it to the host and another visiting guest, Mykhailo Kotsiubynsky. Both praised the book, the latter likened it to "an old tapestry."

The book's plot was fictional but numerous details in it later proved to be autobiographical. The Sukhodol estate bore close resemblance to a family country house in the Oryol Governorate owned by Bunin's uncle Nikolay Nikolayevich where Ivan with his younger sister Masha were frequent guests. The prototype for aunt Tonya was Bunin's aunt Varvara Nikolayevna who lived in a large neighbouring country house (and was, in Vera Muromtseva's assessment, "slightly off-kilter"). Pyotr Kyrillovich character in the book was a veiled portrait of Bunin's grandfather Nikolay Dmitrievich (whose mother, born Uvarova, died young).

Critical reception 
As Ivan Bunin's previous book, The Village, this one divided critical opinion. Some, like Vladimir Kranikhfeld, hailed it as masterpiece. "In Sukhodol Bunin summed up the whole of the [Russia']s past and endowed it with magnificent monument", he wrote in Sovremenny Mir (Modern World). Others criticized the author for negativism. "Dirty, hungry, eaten through to its very bones by illnesses and lice – such is Russia as seen through the eyes of Sukodol author," argued L. Kozlovsky in Russkiye Vedomosti.

References 

1912 Russian novels
Novels by Ivan Bunin
Russian Gothic novels